In computing, the Ardent Window Manager (awm) is an early window manager software for the X Window System. It was descended from uwm.

awm was written by Jordan Hubbard for the Ardent Computer Corporation's TITAN line of workstations in 1988, which ran a version of X11R2. It was included on the X11R3 contrib tape.

The FAQ for the comp.windows.x Usenet newsgroup says: The Ardent Window Manager was for a while a hotbed for hackers and offered some features (dynamic menus) not found on more current window managers.

References 
20) What are all these window managers? (Where can I get a "virtual" wm?) (comp.windows.x FAQ 2/7)

External links 
awm source code (xwinman.org)

X window managers